Markos Sklivaniotis (Greek: Μάρκος Σκληβανιώτης) is a Greek writer and a poet.

He was born in Patras, Greece, 1954.  He studied chemical engineering in Aristotelion University of Thessaloniki and following that he was engaged in research in the University of Leeds, UK, achieving his Ph.D. degree in 1982.  He worked for many years in Patras, In the Municipal Water Utility Sector DEYAP, currently he is retired.

Works

Poems

Books

References
The first version of the article is translated and is based from the article at the Greek Wikipedia (el:Main Page)

External links
All of these two links are only available in the Greek language:
http://www.elogos.gr/lesxi/sklhvaniwths_markos.htm
His information on the water

1954 births
Living people
Poets from Achaea
21st-century Greek poets
Writers from Patras
Greek male poets
21st-century Greek male writers